Walung may refer to:

 Walung, Kosrae, a village in Micronesia
 Walung people, an ethnic group of Tibetan descendants in Nepal
 Walungge language, the language of Walung people
 Olangchung Gola, main settlement of Walung people